Strange Creek is an unincorporated community along Route 4 in Braxton County, West Virginia, United States, near the border with Clay County.  It lies along the bank of the Elk River. The community takes its name from nearby Strange Creek.

References 

Unincorporated communities in West Virginia
Unincorporated communities in Braxton County, West Virginia